Sharon Maas (born 1951) is a Guyanese-born novelist, who was educated in England, lived in India, and subsequently in Germany and in Sussex, United Kingdom. She is the author of The Sugar Planters Daughter.

Biography
Maas was born in Georgetown, Guyana. She came from a prominently political family of Dutch, Amerindian and Afro-Caribbean descent. Her mother was one of Guyana's earliest feminists, human rights activists and consumer advocates; her father was Press Secretary to the Marxist opposition leader and later President of Guyana, Dr Cheddi Jagan.

She was educated in Guyana and England. After leaving school she worked as a trainee reporter with the Guyana Graphic in Georgetown, Guyana. She later wrote feature articles for the Sunday Chronicle as a staff journalist.

In 1973 she travelled overland to India via England, Turkey, Iran, Afghanistan and Pakistan. After two years in India she moved to Germany, where she married a German. She lived in Germany for over 40 years and in 2018 moved to Ireland.

She has written ten novels to date. Her first three novels, published by HarperCollins, focus substantially on their respective protagonists' coming-of-age experience and struggle to find their own, unique identity and place in life ("Bildungsroman"), and are chiefly set against Indian and Guyanese backgrounds. Her fourth book, Sons of Gods  is a retelling of the Mahabharata. In 2014 she signed with the UK digital publisher Bookouture, which re-published Of Marriageable Age in May 2014 and several new works. Peacocks Dancing was republished as The Lost Daughter of India and The Speech of Angels was republished as The Orphan of India.  Her work has been translated into German, Spanish, French, Danish, Hungarian and Polish.

Publications
 Her Darkest Hour  (2020) - novel
 The Violin Maker's Daughter  (2019) - novel
 The Soldier's Girl  (2018)  - novel 
 The Girl from the Sugar Plantation  (2017) - novel
 The Orphan of India  (2017)  - novel
 The Lost Daughter of India  {2017) - novel
 The Sugar Planter's Daughter  (2016) - novel
 The Secret Life of Winnie Cox (2015) – novel
 The Small Fortune of Dorothea Q  (2015) – novel
 Sons of Gods -Mahabharata  (2011) – novel 
 Stories of Strength (2005) – short fiction
 The Speech of Angels (2003) – novel
 Peacocks Dancing (2002) – novel
 Of Marriageable Age (2000) – novel

References

External links 
 Official web site
 Reviews of Maas's novels

Living people
1951 births
Guyanese novelists
Guyanese women novelists
Postcolonial literature
People from Georgetown, Guyana
20th-century novelists
21st-century novelists
20th-century women writers
21st-century women writers
Guyanese people of Dutch descent
Guyanese people of indigenous peoples descent